The Law may refer to:

Books 
 The Law (Bastiat book), an 1850 book by Frédéric Bastiat
 The Law (novel), a 1957 novel by Roger Vailland
  The Law (novella), a 2022 novella by Jim Butcher

Film and television 
 The Law (1959 film), with Gina Lollobrigida (original title: La Legge)
 The Law (1974 film), television film with Judd Hirsch
The Law (TV series), 1975 television miniseries
 The Law (1990 film), 1990 award-winning Burkinabé drama film also known as Tilaï
 The Law (2002 film), 2002 British television film

Geography
 The Law, a peak of the Ochil Hills
 Law, Dundee (locally referred to as "the Law"), an extinct volcanic peak at the centre of the Scottish city of Dundee

Music

Albums 
 The Law (Exhorder album)
 The Law (The Law album)

Ensembles 
 The Law (English band), an English rock group
 The Law (Scottish band), an indie rock band from Scotland

Songs 
 "The Law", a song by Leonard Cohen on the album Various Positions
 "The Law", a song by King Adora
 "The Law", a song by Uriah Heep on the album Outsider
 "The Law", a song by Editors from In Dream

Other uses 
 LAW Live Audio Wrestling (known as "The LAW") is a Canadian sports radio talk show that primarily covers news and events surrounding professional wrestling and mixed martial arts. 
 "The Law", nickname of Dan Law Field, home of the Texas Tech Red Raiders baseball team
 Law or The Law, one of a list of slang terms for police officers
 Torah in Jewish culture is also known as "The Law".
 Lawrence Pemberton (known as "The Law"), a character in an American web series Video Game High School

See also
Law (disambiguation)